Raymour & Flanigan is a high-end American furniture retail chain, based in the Northeastern United States.

Overview
Raymour's Furniture Company, the predecessor of Raymour & Flanigan Furniture, was established by brothers Bernard Goldberg and Arnold Goldberg in 1946.  Raymour & Flanigan Furniture is the largest furniture retailer in the Northeast and the seventh largest in the U.S.

History
Bernard Goldberg and his younger brother, Arnold Goldberg, co-founded the first Raymour Furniture store, the predecessor of Raymour & Flanigan, in late 1946 in downtown Syracuse, New York.  After initially wanting to name their new furniture store "Decker's" the brothers settled on naming the furniture store after an antiques shop on Long Island which was owned by a third brother.

In 1972, Bernard and Arnold Goldberg opened a second Raymour Furniture store in Clay, New York, during which time Bernard Goldberg's son, Neil, joined the family-owned company. Neil's brother Steven Goldberg and cousin Michael Goldberg joined the company 5 years later in 1977.

In 1990, Raymour's Furniture Company acquired competitor, Flanigan's Furniture, which operated fourteen stores in the Buffalo and Rochester areas. The acquisition gave Raymour & Flanigan its present name.

By 2005, the company had begun to focus on expanding its presence in the New York metropolitan area by acquiring Futurama, a furniture retailer with three large stores. In 2007, Raymour & Flanigan purchased Alpert's Furniture, located in the Rhode Island and Southeastern Massachusetts area. In December 2008, Raymour & Flanigan Furniture acquired 18 Levitz Furniture store locations in the New York metro area.

By 2011, the company had 100 stores across seven states in the Northeast. As of 2019, Raymour & Flanigan has expanded to over 140 stores in the Northeastern U.S. In 2016 they introduced two new outlet stores in Philadelphia with the goal of providing a wider range of price points and affordability to consumers. They currently operate over 30 outlet stores throughout the Northeast.

In January 2021 Raymour & Flanigan announced Seth Goldberg, a third-generation member of the family business, has been named the company's new president. Former president and CEO Neil Goldberg will become chairman and CEO, while executive vice presidents Steven and Michael Goldberg will now become vice-chairmen.

Products

Raymour & Flanigan sells home furniture including living room, dining room and bedroom furniture and mattresses.

The company product offering ranges from traditional cherry wood pieces, to more modern styles such as denim sofas from the “Cindy Crawford Home” collection. The company also has a line of upholstered furniture by designer Kathy Ireland.

Awards
In April 2001, Raymour & Flanigan Furniture was named “Retailer of the Year” by the National Home Furnishings Association.  In 2004, Raymour & Flanigan Furniture received the “Retailer of the Year Award” from Furniture Today. In 2007, Raymour & Flanigan Furniture was named "Newsmaker of the Year" by Home Furnishings Business.

In 2009, the Greater New York Home Furnishings Association announced that the “Jerry Gans Memorial Award” would be awarded to the Goldberg family on behalf of the entire Raymour & Flanigan organization.

In 2013, the Goldberg family received the Spirit of Life Award from the City of Hope in recognition of Raymour & Flanigan's philanthropy and business leadership.

Raymour & Flanigan was voted “Best Furniture Store on Long Island” in 2016 and 2017 through the “Best of Long Island” program.

References

External links

Furniture retailers of the United States
American companies established in 1946
Retail companies established in 1946
Companies based in Syracuse, New York
1946 establishments in New York (state)